SS Roma can refer to multiple ships:

 SS Roma 1881 (formerly County of Sutherland, built 1873 for R. & J. Craig, Glasgow) Purchased by British India Associated Steamers Ltd and renamed SS Roma, broken up 1898.
 SS Roma (1926)
 MV Doulos

Ship names